Cannibalization of fiction refers to adapting, borrowing or stealing plots, characters, themes or ideas from one story for use in another or from one medium to another, such as a film adaptation of a book.

Authors Michael Baigent and Richard Leigh alleged that fellow author Dan Brown had cannibalised their book The Holy Blood and the Holy Grail in writing The Da Vinci Code.

The Doctor Who television episode "Dalek" is an example of legitimate cannibalisation, the writer having adapted elements of the Doctor Who audio drama Jubilee for this television episode.

See also
Plagiarism

References

Fiction